The Hausa mouse (Mus haussa) is a species of rodent in the family Muridae.
It is found in Benin, Burkina Faso, Ivory Coast, Ghana, Mali, Mauritania, Niger, Nigeria, and Senegal.
Its natural habitats are dry savanna, arable land, rural gardens, and urban areas.

References

Musser, G. G. and M. D. Carleton. 2005. Superfamily Muroidea. pp. 894–1531 in Mammal Species of the World a Taxonomic and Geographic Reference. D. E. Wilson and D. M. Reeder eds. Johns Hopkins University Press, Baltimore.

Mus (rodent)
Mammals described in 1920
Taxa named by Oldfield Thomas
Taxa named by Martin Hinton
Taxonomy articles created by Polbot